Raphanocera is a genus of flies in the family Stratiomyidae.

Species
Raphanocera turanica Pleske, 1922

References

Stratiomyidae
Brachycera genera
Diptera of Asia